The following outline is provided as an overview of and topical guide to Zambia:

Zambia – landlocked sovereign country located in Southern Africa. Zambia has been inhabited for thousands of years by hunter-gatherers and migrating tribes. After sporadic visits by European explorers starting in the 18th century, Zambia was gradually claimed and occupied by the British as protectorate of Northern Rhodesia towards the end of the nineteenth century. On 24 October 1964, the protectorate gained independence with the new name of Zambia, derived from the Zambezi river which flows through the country. After independence the country moved towards a system of one party rule with Kenneth Kaunda as president. Kaunda dominated Zambian politics until multiparty elections were held in 1991.

General reference 

Pronunciation: 
Common English country name:  Zambia
Official English country name:  The Republic of Zambia
Common endonym(s):  
Official endonym(s):  
Adjectival(s): Zambian
Demonym(s):
Etymology: Name of Zambia
International rankings of Zambia
ISO country codes:  ZM, ZMB, 894
ISO region codes:  See ISO 3166-2:ZM
Internet country code top-level domain:  .zm

Geography of Zambia 

Geography of Zambia
Zambia is: a landlocked country
Location:
Eastern Hemisphere and Southern Hemisphere
Africa
East Africa
Southern Africa
Time zone:  Central Africa Time (UTC+02)
Extreme points of Zambia
High:  unnamed location in Mafinga Hills 
Low:  Zambezi 
Land boundaries:  5,665 km
 1,930 km
 1,110 km
 837 km
 797 km
 419 km
 338 km
 233 km
 1 km
Coastline:  none
Population of Zambia: 11,922,000  - 72nd most populous country

Area of Zambia: 752,618 km2
Atlas of Zambia

Environment of Zambia 

Climate of Zambia
Ecoregions in Zambia
Protected areas of Zambia
National parks of Zambia
KAZA
Kafue National Park
Kasanka National Park
Liuwa Plain National Park
Lochinvar National Park
Lower Zambezi National Park
Luambe National Park
Mosi-oa-Tunya National Park
North Luangwa National Park
Nsumbu National Park
Nyika National Park, Zambia
South Luangwa National Park
Mweru Wantipa National Park
Sioma Ngwezi National Park
Wildlife of Zambia
Fauna of Zambia
Birds of Zambia
Mammals of Zambia

Natural geographic features of Zambia 

Glaciers in Zambia: none
Lakes of Zambia
Lake Bangweulu
Lake Kariba
Lake Kashiba
Lake Ishiba Ng'andu
Mita Hills Dam
Mulungushi Dam
Mofwe Lagoon
Lake Mweru
Lake Mweru Wantipa
Lake Tanganyika
Rift Valley lakes
Rivers of Zambia
Chambeshi River
Congo River
Cuando River
Kabompo River
Kafue River
Kalambo River
Kalungwishi River
Luanginga River
Luangwa River
Luapula River
Luena River, Western Zambia
Lukasashi River
Lunga River (Zambia)
Lungwebungu River
Lunsemfwa River
Mbereshi River
Zambezi
Mulungushi River
Waterfalls of Zambia
Chavuma Falls
Kabwelume Falls
Kalambo Falls
Lumangwe Falls
Ngonye Falls
Ntumbachushi Falls
Victoria Falls
Mumbuluma Falls
Mutumuna Falls
Kabweluma Falls
Chishimba Falls
Kundalila Falls
Wetlands
Bangweulu Wetlands
Lukanga Swamp
World Heritage Sites in Zambia

Regions of Zambia 

Regions of Zambia

Ecoregions of Zambia 

List of ecoregions in Zambia
 Ecoregions in Zambia

Administrative divisions of Zambia 

Administrative divisions of Zambia
Provinces of Zambia
Districts of Zambia
Municipalities of Zambia

Provinces of Zambia 

Provinces of Zambia
Zambia is divided into ten provinces:
Central
Copperbelt
Eastern
Luapula
Lusaka
Muchinga
Northern
North-Western
Southern
Western

Districts of Zambia 

Districts of Zambia
The nine provinces of Zambia are divided into a total of 72 districts:

Central Province
Chibombo
Kabwe
Kapiri Mposhi
Mkushi
Mumbwa
Serenje

Copperbelt Province
Chililabombwe
Chingola
Kalulushi
Kitwe
Luanshya
Lufwanyama
Mufulira
Ndola

Eastern Province
Chadiza
Chama
Chipata
Katete
Lundazi
Petauke

Luapula Province
Chiengi
Kawambwa
Mansa
Milenge
Nchelenge
Samfya

Lusaka Province
Kafue
Luangwa
Lusaka

North-Western Province
Chavuma
Kabompo
Kasempa
Mufumbwe
Mwinilunga
Solwezi
Zambezi

Northern Province
Chilubi
Chinsali
Isoka
Kasama
Mbala
Mpika
Mporokoso
Mpulungu

Southern Province
Choma
Gwembe
Itezhi-Tezhi
Kalomo
Kazungula
Livingstone
Mazabuka
Monze
Namwala
Siavonga
Sinazongwe

Western Province
Kalabo
Kaoma
Lukulu
Mongu
Senanga
Sesheke
Shangombo

Municipalities of Zambia 

Municipalities of Zambia
Capital of Zambia: Lusaka
Cities of Zambia
Lusaka
Kitwe
Ndola
Kabwe
Chingola
Mufulira
Livingstone
Luanshya
Kasama
Chipata

Demography of Zambia 

Demographics of Zambia

Government and politics of Zambia 

Politics of Zambia
Form of government: presidential representative democratic republic
Capital of Zambia: Lusaka
Elections in Zambia
Zambian parliamentary election, 1991
Zambian presidential election, 1991
Zambian presidential election, 2001
Zambian parliamentary election, 2006
Zambian presidential election, 2006
Zambian general election, 2006
Political parties in Zambia
List of political parties in Zambia
Forum for Democracy and Development
Heritage Party
Movement for Multiparty Democracy
National Citizens' Coalition
National Democratic Focus
Patriotic Front (Zambia)
Revolutionary Socialist Party (Zambia)
United Democratic Alliance (Zambia)
United Liberal Party (Zambia)
United National Independence Party
United Party for National Development
United Progressive Party (Zambia)
Zambia Alliance for Progress
Zambia Republic Party
Zambian African National Congress
Taxation in Zambia

Branches of the government of Zambia 

Government of Zambia

Executive branch of the government of Zambia 
Head of state and government: President of Zambia, [Edgar Chagwa Lungu]
List of presidents of Zambia
Prime Minister of Zambia
Cabinet of Zambia
Ministries of Zambia
Ministry of Health

Legislative branch of the government of Zambia 

National Assembly of Zambia (unicameral)

Judicial branch of the government of Zambia 

Court system of Zambia
Supreme Court of Zambia
High court
Magistrate's court
Local courts

Foreign relations of Zambia 

Foreign relations of Zambia
Diplomatic missions in Zambia
United States Ambassador to Zambia
Diplomatic missions of Zambia

International organization membership 

International organization membership of Zambia
The Republic of Zambia is a member of:

African, Caribbean, and Pacific Group of States (ACP)
African Development Bank Group (AfDB)
African Union/United Nations Hybrid operation in Darfur (UNAMID)
African Union (AU)
Common Market for Eastern and Southern Africa (COMESA)
Commonwealth of Nations
Food and Agriculture Organization (FAO)
Group of 77 (G77)
International Atomic Energy Agency (IAEA)
International Bank for Reconstruction and Development (IBRD)
International Civil Aviation Organization (ICAO)
International Criminal Court (ICCt)
International Criminal Police Organization (Interpol)
International Development Association (IDA)
International Federation of Red Cross and Red Crescent Societies (IFRCS)
International Finance Corporation (IFC)
International Fund for Agricultural Development (IFAD)
International Labour Organization (ILO)
International Monetary Fund (IMF)
International Olympic Committee (IOC)
International Organization for Migration (IOM)
International Organization for Standardization (ISO) (correspondent)
International Red Cross and Red Crescent Movement (ICRM)
International Telecommunication Union (ITU)
International Telecommunications Satellite Organization (ITSO)
International Trade Union Confederation (ITUC)

Inter-Parliamentary Union (IPU)
Multilateral Investment Guarantee Agency (MIGA)
Nonaligned Movement (NAM)
Organisation for the Prohibition of Chemical Weapons (OPCW)
Permanent Court of Arbitration (PCA)
Southern African Development Community (SADC)
United Nations (UN)
United Nations Conference on Trade and Development (UNCTAD)
United Nations Educational, Scientific, and Cultural Organization (UNESCO)
United Nations High Commissioner for Refugees (UNHCR)
United Nations Industrial Development Organization (UNIDO)
United Nations Mission in Liberia (UNMIL)
United Nations Mission in the Central African Republic and Chad (MINURCAT)
United Nations Mission in the Sudan (UNMIS)
United Nations Operation in Cote d'Ivoire (UNOCI)
United Nations Organization Mission in the Democratic Republic of the Congo (MONUC)
Universal Postal Union (UPU)
World Confederation of Labour (WCL)
World Customs Organization (WCO)
World Federation of Trade Unions (WFTU)
World Health Organization (WHO)
World Intellectual Property Organization (WIPO)
World Meteorological Organization (WMO)
World Tourism Organization (UNWTO)
World Trade Organization (WTO)

Law and order in Zambia 

Law of Zambia

 Zambia Police Service
Constitution of Zambia
Human rights in Zambia
LGBT rights in Zambia

Military of Zambia 

Military of Zambia
Command
Commander-in-chief: Sitting President
Military forces
Zambian Defence Force
Army of Zambia
Navy of Zambia: None
Zambian Air Force

Local government in Zambia 

Local government in Zambia

History of Zambia 

History of Zambia
 Current events of Zambia
Military history of Zambia:

History of Zambia
Africa House, The
British South Africa Company
British South Africa Police
Cape to Cairo Road
Copperbelt strike (1935)
East African Campaign (World War I)
Federation of Rhodesia and Nyasaland
Federation of Rhodesia and Nyasaland election, 1953
Governor-General of the Federation of Rhodesia and Nyasaland
Governor of Northern Rhodesia
History of Africa
History of Church activities in Zambia
Luapula Province border dispute
Lunda Empire
Mulungushi
Mwata Yamvo
North-Eastern Rhodesia
Northern Rhodesia
Northern Rhodesian African National Congress
North-Western Rhodesia
Old Drift cemetery
Rhodesia (disambiguation)
Rhodesia and Nyasaland pound
Rhodesian Man
Stairs Expedition
The Africa House
Zambia Independence Act 1964
Zambian pound

Archaeological sites 
See also Kalambo Falls in the Geography list above
Ing-ombe Ilede
Mumbwa Caves
Gwisho Hot-Springs

Disasters 
1977 Dan-Air Boeing 707 crash

Topic 
History of rail transport in Zambia
History of the Jews in Zambia
Postage stamps and postal history of Zambia

Culture of Zambia 

Culture of Zambia
Cuisine of Zambia
Media in Zambia
National symbols of Zambia
Coat of arms of Zambia
Flag of Zambia
National anthem: Stand and Sing of Zambia, Proud and Free
Prostitution in Zambia
Public holidays in Zambia
Scouting in Zambia
Girl Guides Association of Zambia
Zambia Scouts Association
World Heritage Sites in Zambia
Miscellaneous
Ibwatu
Kuomboka
Lwiindi
Mangwe
Nshima
Nsolo
Tonga baskets
Zambian traditional ceremonies

Art in Zambia 
Music of Zambia
Theatre in Zambia

Music of Zambia 

Music of Zambia
Kalindula
National Arts Council of Zambia
Ngoma Music Award
Silimba
Zamrock

Musical groups 
Amayenge
Distro Kuomboka
Mashombe Blue Jeans

Languages of Zambia 

Languages of Zambia
Bemba language
Chichewa language
Cilungu
Fanagalo
Kaonde language
Lamba language
Lozi language
Kaonde language
Lunda language
Mambwe language
Nkoya language
Shona language
Tonga language (Zambia)
Tumbuka language
Yauma language

People of Zambia 

People of Zambia
Ethnic groups
Ba Yombe
Balovale
Bemba people
British diaspora in Africa
Chewa people
Chokwe
Eastern Lunda
Kanongesha-Lunda
Kazembe-Lunda
Lozi people
Lunda people
Mambwe
Mwanga (ethnic group)
Namwanga
Ngoni people
Nsenga people
Nyamwanga
Nyiha
Rungu (African ethnic group)
Tokaleya
Tonga people of Zambia and Zimbabwe
Tumbuka

Specific Zambians

Religion 

Religion in Zambia
Christianity in Zambia
Hinduism in Zambia
Islam in Zambia
Hinduism in Zambia
Islam in Zambia
Lumpa Church
Roman Catholicism in Zambia
Roman Catholic Archdiocese of Kasama
Roman Catholic Archdiocese of Lusaka
Roman Catholic Diocese of Mansa
Roman Catholic Diocese of Mpika
White Fathers

Sport in Zambia 

Sport in Zambia
2011 All-Africa Games
Zambia at the 2006 Commonwealth Games

Football in Zambia 

Football Association of Zambia
Zambia national football team

Football competitions 
Zambian Challenge Cup
Zambian Coca-Cola Cup
Zambian Cup
Zambian Premier League

Football venues 
Dag Hammerskjold Stadium
Dola Hill Stadium
Edwin Imboela Stadium
Garden Park
Independence Stadium (Zambia)
Konkola Stadium
Nchanga Stadium
New Livingstone Stadium
Heroes Stadium
Levy Mwanawasa Stadium
Railways Stadium
Sunset Stadium

Football clubs 
Forest Rangers Football Club
Green Buffaloes FC
Kabwe Warriors Football Club
Kitwe United Football Club
Konkola Blades Football Club
Lusaka Dynamos
Mufulira Wanderers
National Assembly Football Club
Nchanga Rangers
Nkana Red Devils
Nkwazi Football Club
Power Dynamos FC
ZESCO United Football Club
Zanaco FC
Roan United

Other sports 

Commonwealth XI cricket team in Rhodesia in 1962-63
International XI cricket team in Rhodesia in 1961-62
Zambia Davis Cup team
Zambia national basketball team
Zambia National Commercial Bank
Zambia national cricket team
Zambia national rugby union team
Zambia women's national rugby union team

Zambia at the Olympics 
Northern Rhodesia at the 1964 Summer Olympics
Zambia at the 1968 Summer Olympics
Zambia at the 1972 Summer Olympics
Zambia at the 1980 Summer Olympics
Zambia at the 1984 Summer Olympics
Zambia at the 1988 Summer Olympics
Zambia at the 1992 Summer Olympics
Zambia at the 1996 Summer Olympics
Zambia at the 2000 Summer Olympics
Zambia at the 2004 Summer Olympics

Economy and infrastructure of Zambia 

Economy of Zambia
Economic rank, by nominal GDP (2007): 111th (one hundred and eleventh)
Banking in Zambia
National Bank of Zambia
Communications in Zambia
Internet in Zambia
.zm
Companies of Zambia
Chilanga Cement
First Quantum Minerals of Canada
Glencore International
Illovo Sugar
Konkola Copper Mines
Zambeef Products
Zambia Consolidated Copper Mines
Zambia Post
Zambian Airways
Zamtel
Currency of Zambia: Kwacha
ISO 4217: ZMK
Energy in Zambia
 Power Stations in Zambia
Oil industry in Zambia
Tazama Pipeline
Health care in Zambia
Mining in Zambia
Copperbelt
Stock exchange: Lusaka Stock Exchange
Tourism in Zambia
See also Geography and Environment sections above
Chimfunshi Wildlife Orphanage
Livingstone Memorial
Monuments and Historic Sites of Zambia
Von Lettow-Vorbeck Memorial
Trade unions
Federation of Free Trade Unions of Zambia
Zambia Congress of Trade Unions
Transport in Zambia
Air transport
Airlines in Zambia
Zambian Airways
Defunct airlines
Aero Zambia
Airwaves Airlink
Eastern Air
Nationwide Airlines (Zambia)
Zambia Airways
Airports in Zambia
List of airports in Zambia
Chipata Airport
Livingstone Airport
Lusaka International Airport
Mfuwe Airport
Ndola Airport
Ngoma Airport
Solwezi Airport
Rail transport in Zambia
Benguela railway
Mpika railway station
Mulobezi Railway
TAZARA Railway
Zambia Railways
Roads in Zambia
Cape to Cairo Road
Cairo Road
Congo Pedicle road
Trans–Caprivi Highway
Great East Road (Zambia)
Great North Road (Zambia)
Bridges in Zambia
Chirundu Bridge
Kafue Railway Bridge
Katima Mulilo Bridge
Luangwa Bridge
Victoria Falls Bridge
Water Transport in Zambia
Dugout (boat)
Ferries
Kabompo Ferry
Kazungula Ferry
MV Liemba
Water supply and sanitation in Zambia
Dams
Itezhi-Tezhi Dam
Kariba Dam
Mulungushi Dam
Mita Hills Dam

Education in Zambia 

Education in Zambia
List of schools in Zambia
Sakeji School
Primary schools
Musikili Primary School
Secondary schools
Banani International Secondary School
Canisius Secondary School
Chengelo Secondary School
Chizongwe Secondary School
Munali Secondary School
Colleges
Baobab College

See also 

Zambia
Index of Zambia-related articles
List of international rankings
List of Zambia-related topics
Member states of the Commonwealth of Nations
Member state of the United Nations
Outline of Africa

References

External links 

The Tourist Board of Zambia (Extensive travel guide)
The Government of Zambia (State House)
The Parliament of Zambia (National Assembly)
Zambia News Agency

CIA World Factbook article on Zambia
US State Department: Zambia
IRIN humanitarian news and analysis - Zambia

Zambia
 1